Missula Suryanarayana Murti (4 February 1911 – August 1973) was an Indian politician and Member of Parliament.

Early life
Murti was born to Shri Venkanna at Kondakarla in Brahmin family. He married on 29 May 1929. They had 6 children, 4 sons and 2 daughters.

Career
Murthi graduated with a B.SC. in Chemistry and researched activated carbon from agricultural refuse and sugar technology while working in the sugar plant located near Anakapalli.

He was a member of Pradesh Congress Committee after 1945. He was president of Visakhapatnam District Congress Committee from 1942 to 1946 and from 1953 to 1957.

He was elected to the 2nd Lok Sabha from Golugonda Constituency in 1957 and 3rd Lok Sabha and 4th Lok Sabha from Anakapalli constituency in 1962 and 1967 respectively as a member of Indian National Congress.

Though he was elected repeatedly, lifelong he lived in a hut in kondakarla. He sold most of his inheritance for the sake to serve the people residing in his constituency during the tenure he is in office.

Before entering into politics, he was the President of Kondakarla, Atchutapuaram Mandal.

He established development techniques including Harijan (outcaste) development and a cooperative society in his Kondakarla for educating deprived students.

Some of his Social activities are Organising co-operative Societies, Harijan uplift and rural welfare.

External links
 Biodata of M. S. Murti at Lok Sabha website.
 Some Photographs of M. S. Murthy at Wikimapia.org

Telugu politicians
India MPs 1957–1962
India MPs 1962–1967
India MPs 1967–1970
1911 births
1973 deaths
Lok Sabha members from Andhra Pradesh
Indian National Congress politicians from Andhra Pradesh
People from Visakhapatnam district